Marian Kielec (born 6 March 1942) is a Polish footballer. He played in one match for the Poland national football team in 1962. Kielec started his career with Pogoń Szczecin.

References

External links
 

1942 births
Living people
Polish footballers
Poland international footballers
Association football forwards
People from Câmpulung Moldovenesc
Pogoń Szczecin players